Saba Rajendran is an Indian politician and an incumbent Member of legislative assembly of Tamil Nadu, Neyveli.

He was born in Sorathur on 18 June 1961. He holds a B.Sc. in Mathematics and a B.E. in mechanical engineering.

He was elected to the Tamil Nadu legislative assembly as a Dravida Munnetra Kazhagam candidate from Neyveli constituency in the 2016 elections. Previously he was elected to the Tamil Nadu legislative assembly as a Dravida Munnetra Kazhagam candidate from Nellikuppam constituency in the 2006 election. He again won the election in 2021 in Neyveli constituency.

Early life and education 
Saba Rajendran, was born and brought up in Sorathur village, Cuddalore, Tamilnadu. Born in a family of leaders, he was naturally inclined towards social welfare, where his father was a panchayat leader and his mother was supportive of farming activities. Coming from a background of farmers, he has emphasized the need for proper ground water and natural farming. Prior to entering politics, he has actively voiced the struggles of the farmers and deployed various initiatives in support of these causes.

With Neyveli being the hub of electricity production in Tamilnadu, he was interested in Mechanical sciences and completed his Bachelor’s in JMIT, Chitradurga.

Through the work of Jawaharlal Nehru and Periyar, he found sincere passion towards political work and found integrity and need for social welfare through the work of M. Karunanidhi. The zeal to enter full time politics arrived when he found his political ideologies coinciding with that of Dravida Munnetra Kazhagam’s values.
Before actively contesting the Tamilnadu legislative assembly elections, he was appointed the Union Secretary of the DMK Panruti wing. He was also the director of the Lions Club, Neyveli, heading a group of established leaders. Owing to his interest in sports, he was the President of the football association, Cuddalore and aimed to promote a sport culture among the youth.

After assuming office as an MLA, he continues to work in his position at the DMK Panruti wing, while being a prominent member in major committees such as the Petitions Committee, Assurance Committee and Estimate Committee, continuing to serve people through any level of responsibility.

Political career 

In the 2006 Tamil Nadu Legislative Assembly election,
Saba Rajendran contested the Nellikuppam constituency and won the election, under the leadership of Kalaignar.

In the 2011 Tamil Nadu Legislative Assembly election, he represented DMK and lost the election to a Desiya Murpokku Dravida Kazhagam candidate by a vote share difference of 6%.

Subsequently, in the 2016 and 2021 Tamil Nadu Legislative Assembly election, he won in the Neyveli constituency.

Throughout his career, he has achieved significant milestones, aimed at cohesive growth of the citizens and nurturing an entrepreneurship culture.

2016-Present
In Neyveli, the Kasambu lake was inaugurated by M. K. Stalin, which was preceded by efficient desilting of 30 surrounding lakes like the Chozhan lake, accompanied by tree plantation. Aided by NLC India Limited, solar water pumps were installed for sustainable water access in Sorathur, Visoor and other panchayats.

Higher-secondary schools in the surrounding districts were elevated to senior-secondary schools enabling higher education for over 700 students. Infrastructural additions were made through construction of compound walls and refurbishing the school complexes.

Irrigation and drinking water facilities were improved vis a vis purchasing and installation of Mini power pumps, sluice repairs, reverse osmosis plants and pipeline extensions in areas like Siruvathur and Purangani.

On the labour welfare front, he has conducted routine peace talks to understand the issues faced by the labourers and to normalize the situation whenever possible.

2006-2011
In Nellikuppam, the implementation of the Malattaar scheme benefited over 50 villages by increasing groundwater access. Four bridges were built and the 25 km stretch was inspected and revamped to accomplish the same.

Further, the reduction of an 8-km stretch of the Naduveerapattu bridge enhanced road connectivity for 20000 people. Other public access facilities like ration shops, bus stands were restructured and monitored thoroughly.

Electoral performance

Social Interests and Initiatives

Agriculture
Apart from political outcomes, Saba Rajendran works towards overall development in the agricultural interests of the state. He has implemented schemes that ensure that farmers are given appropriate compensation through the cooperation societies, and improve silos and cold-storage facilities. To enhance the irrigation sources, restoration activities were executed on lakes consecutively, wherein a major source was stabilized. Access through borewells was also renewed and more such wells were constructed.
Throughout his tenure, 41 village panchayats have witnessed a healthy improvement in their agricultural interests.

Entrepreneurship and Education
He has also worked towards increasing access to proper education and instilling the spirit of entrepreneurship. In 2018, he conducted an entrepreneurship camp for youngsters which witnessed eager participation and proposed the construction of the Kattupalayam school building and renovation of other surrounding schools. Important amenities such as compound walls and washrooms were installed with the schools being refurbished.

Healthcare
With over 30 free healthcare camps, people with a lower access to conventional health facilities were given full checkups. By increasing the number of primary health centers and hospitals in Nellikuppam and Neyveli, he continues to emphasize the importance of quality healthcare. Other amenities such as bus shelters, resting sheds and kitchen sheds have also been constructed under his directive.

Labour welfare
Through various schemes, different verticals of the community have benefited and improved over the years. He has worked on understanding labour issues pertaining to the NLC and implemented measures to improve the work environment and to prevent further accident occurrence. Having orchestrated successful peace talks to avoid a strike of over 12000 labourers and contract employees, he went on to amend the salary hike and the accident compensation package from ₹1 lakh to ₹25 lakh.
Upon revamping the housing board, 840 houses were built in and around Neyveli. Road connectivity was improved by connecting the Neyveli- Muthandikuppam areas and other surrounding villages. Safety issues were mitigated through installation of street lights and solar lights.

Initiatives
In the midst of the COVID-19 pandemic, he has launched the “Ondrinaivom Vaa” campaign, aimed at providing people with essentials and supplies to tackle the local recession. By gathering and distributing materials such as Kabasura Kudineer, protective equipment and food supplies, the campaign has helped over 15000 families collectively.
Relief measures were also effectively implemented after the Nivar cyclone struck the Neyveli constituency and surrounding villages, which was overseen by M.K. Stalin.
He has advocated support to the farmers in the 2020 Indian farmers' protest and participated in protests in the Cuddalore district.

References

Living people
1961 births
Dravida Munnetra Kazhagam politicians
Tamil Nadu politicians
Tamil Nadu MLAs 2006–2011
Tamil Nadu MLAs 2016–2021
Tamil Nadu MLAs 2021–2026